Brštica is a village in Serbia. It is situated in the Krupanj municipality in Central Serbia. The village had a Serb ethnic majority and a population of 1,254 in 2002.

Historical population

1948: 1,080
1953: 1,213
1961: 1,352
1971: 1,222
1981: 1,186
1991: 1,243
2002: 1,254

References

See also
List of places in Serbia
Stolice, a notable part of Brštica

Populated places in Mačva District